The Chiesa di San Giuliano (St Julian), commonly called San Zulian in the Venetian dialect, is a church in Venice. San Zulian is in the parish of San Salvador.

It is situated on the Merceria, the main shopping street of the city. Originally a structure from the 9th century; it underwent a number of reconstructions, including likely after the 1105 fire of the neighborhood. The façade was constructed in 1553-1554 by Jacopo Sansovino, and completed after his death in 1570 by Alessandro Vittoria.

The flattened classical temple façade was paid for by the scholar Tommaso Rangone, whose bronze seated portrait appears above the door. In his hands, the physician Rangone holds sarsaparilla and guaiacum, two plants which he used to treat syphilis and yellow fever. The reliefs also depict a map of the world as was known at his death. As befitting his broad-ranging interests in classic texts, the flanking inscriptions are in Latin (center), Greek (right) and Hebrew (left) text.

The interior was also designed by Sansovino, and the church consecrated in 1580.

Main artworks
Facade elements

 Interior
 Girolamo Campagna (terracotta figures of the Virgin Mary and Mary Magdalene and a marble altar panel in the chapel to the left of the high altar)
 Palma the Younger (St Julian in Glory on the central panel of the ceiling)
 Paolo Veronese (Pietà with SS Roch, Jerome and Mark on the south wall)
 The upper walls are painted by Leonardo Corona, Giovanni Fiammingo, and Palma.
 Organ from 1764 opus 12 by Gaetano Callido

External links
San Zulian blogspot.
Works of Art Discovered in Venice, Alethea Wiel. The Burlington Magazine for Connoisseurs (1909) 15(78):p. 368-9. (On works of art found in the rafters of San Zulian).

Roman Catholic churches completed in 1570
16th-century Roman Catholic church buildings in Italy
Jacopo Sansovino buildings
Roman Catholic churches in Venice
1570 establishments in Italy